William Nedham  (c. 1740–1806) was an Irish and  British politician who sat in the House of Commons between 1774 and 1790.

Nedham was the third son of Robert Nedham MP and his wife Catherine Pitt, daughter of Robert Pitt MP of Boconnoc, Cornwall. His family had long established connections in Jamaica, but he and his father never lived there.  He was educated at Eton College from 1756 to 1761 and was admitted at Trinity Hall, Cambridge on 31 January 1762. He was also admitted at the Inner Temple on 2 May 1758. He was awarded MA in 1766. In 1767, he succeeded his brother and had property at Howbery Park, Oxfordshire,  Edwinstone, Nottinghamshire and Symonds Place, Waresley Park, Huntingdonshire.
 
Nedham was a member of the Parliament of Ireland for Newry from 1767 to 1776. He was returned as Member of Parliament for Winchelsea on the Nesbitt interest at a by-election  on 13 August 1774, but Parliament was dissolved six weeks later. At the 1774 general election  he stood at Wallingford where he was supported by Lord Abingdon, but had  to withdraw after polling began.

He was High Sheriff of Oxfordshire in 1774–5. He was returned for Winchelsea again in a by-election on 3 January 1775 after Arnold Nesbitt  decided to sit for Cricklade instead. In the 1780 general election Nedham was returned for Pontefract by his friend Robert Monckton-Arundell, 4th Viscount Galway. He was once again returned for Winchelsea at the 1784 general election on the Nesbitt interest. He did not stand in 1790. He appears never to have spoken in the House of Commons.

Nedham died unmarried at his home in Grosvenor Square on 27 April 1806, aged 65.

References

 

1740s births
1806 deaths
People educated at Eton College
Alumni of Trinity Hall, Cambridge
Members of the Inner Temple
British MPs 1768–1774
British MPs 1774–1780
British MPs 1780–1784
British MPs 1784–1790
Members of the Parliament of Great Britain for English constituencies
High Sheriffs of Oxfordshire